Lucas Agustín Decicilia (born May 11, 1998 in Argentina) is an Argentinian sport shooter. He won the Men's 10m Air Rifle event at 2014 ISSF World Cup, Fort Benning, thus earning a quota to participate in the 2014 Youth Olympic Games.

Career

References

External links 
Lucas Decicilia COARG Profile 
Portrait of the athlete, DECICILIA, Lucas - ARG

1998 births
Living people
Shooters at the 2014 Summer Youth Olympics